SBR may refer to:

Science and technology
 Sequencing batch reactor, for wastewater treatment
 Spectral band replication, to enhance audio codecs
 Shooting and bouncing rays, in computational electromagnetics 
 Styrene-butadiene rubbers
 Serum bilirubin, in blood
 Screen-to-body ratio, a measurement for smartphones and tablets

Military
 Short-barreled rifle, US legal designation
 Space-based radar, on satellites

Organizations
 SBR Creative Media, advising radio stations
 Specialised Bulk Rail, a subsidiary of SCT Logistics in Australia
 Station biologique de Roscoff, French oceanography station
 Stratford on Avon and Broadway Railway, England
 Stone Brothers Racing, a former Australian motor racing team

Other uses
 Skills-based routing, of phone calls
 Standard Business Reporting, programs to reduce business regulations
 Shanghai Business Review
 Samuel Butler Room, the Middle Combination Room of St John's College, Cambridge
 Summit Bechtel Reserve, of the Boy Scouts of America
JoJo's Bizarre Adventure: Steel Ball Run, manga written by Hirohiko Araki
Saibai Island Airport, IATA airport code "SBR"